Itapuã do Oeste is a municipality located in the Brazilian state of Rondônia. Its population was 10,641 (2020) and its area is 4,081 km².

The municipality contains 24% of the fully protected  Samuel Ecological Station.

References

Municipalities in Rondônia